Aqil may refer to:

Given name
 Aqil Agha, semi-autonomous Arab ruler of northern Palestine 
 Aqil Hussain Barlas, lawyer and diplomat 
 Aqil Mammadov, Azerbaijani footballer
 Aqil Davidson,
 Aqil Savik,
 Aqil Yazid,

Surname 
 Ibn Aqil, Muslim theologian

Geography
 Aqil, Iran, a village in East Azerbaijan Province, Iran

See also
 Akil (disambiguation)